Carrawburgh is a settlement in Northumberland.  In Roman times, it was the site of a -acre (1.5 ha) auxiliary fort on Hadrian's Wall called Brocolitia, Procolita, or Brocolita. This name is probably based on the Celtic name for the place, and one possible translation put forward is 'badger holes'.  The fort there was a mile or so west of the Wall's northernmost point at Limestone Corner, and just over a mile west of the nearest milecastle, Milecastle 30.  The fort either used the Wall (narrow gauge on a broad base at this point) itself as its northern rampart, or was built parallel to it but detached.  It certainly postdates both the Wall and the vallum (which it is built across).

Only the fort's earthworks are now visible, the Wall at this point and the fort's north ramparts having been demolished for the construction of General Wade's early 18th-century military road (now the B6318).  The late 19th-century archaeologist John Clayton carried out a partial excavation of the site, revealing a military bath-house outside the fort's west gate (in 1873) and the fort's south-west corner-tower (in 1876).

The Roman Inscriptions of Britain lists 48 inscriptions for the site.  They show its garrisoning units to have been as follows:
RIB 1550 – Hadrianic? c. AD133 – First Cohort of Aquitani
RIB 1563b – AD122-138 – Cohors I Tungrorum
End 2nd century – Cohors I Cugernorum
RIB 1544, RIB 1553, and Notitia Dignitarum – AD213-222, AD237, and AD400 respectively – First Cohort of Batavians

The First Cohort of Frisiavones are also attested at Brocolitia at some stage, as shown by an inscription on an altar stone, which tells us that Optio Maus had repaid a vow to the goddess Coventina.  (This unit is also recorded as present at Ardotalia.) Whether this altar was the repayment of the vow is unknown.

Roman sanctuaries

The remains of three Roman sanctuaries have been discovered in the low-lying marshy ground beyond the fort's south-west corner. All three sites lie adjacent to a small tributary stream of Meggie's Dene Burn, which runs three miles from Carrawburgh to empty into the River South Tyne near Newbrough's fort on the Stanegate.

 
Nearest to the fort, about 80 metres from its south-west corner, are the remains of an early 3rd century mithraeum, i.e. a temple of the mystery cult of the Roman god Mithras. Discovered in 1949 and excavated by I.A. Richmond and J.P. Gillam in 1950, it is the second-most northernly mithraeum discovered so far – only Bremenium (High Rochester), more than ten miles from Brocolitia, is further north. The Brocolitia mithraeum is also the only sanctuary outside the Rhine provinces from which a monument of the  goddess Vagdavercustis has been recovered. Like most other mithraea, the Brocolitia temple was built to resemble a cave, and also had the usual anteroom, and a nave with raised benches (podia) along the sides.

At Brocolitia, the anteroom and nave were separated by a wattle-work screen, the base of which was found exceptionally well preserved. Excavations revealed three stages of development: the first stage was small, around 5.5 metres wide and 8 metres long. The building was expanded to 11 metres length in a second stage, at which time the temple also gained elaborate furnishings and extensive woodwork. This second stage existed for the entire 3rd century, and included at least two major renovations. The second stage was looted and the furnishings destroyed around 296–297 AD, but the sanctuary itself and the stone monuments remained intact, and the temple was re-equipped in a third stage shortly thereafter. The third stage includes three monuments by different cohort prefects, commanders of Cohors I Batavorum, a Roman Batavi unit of auxiliary cavalry stationed at Brocolitia. All three date to the 3rd century. The youngest coin found on the premises was a freshly-minted follis of Maximian (r. 296–308). This coincides with the third structural period on Hadrian's Wall (297–367), but the complete lack of coins from after 308 suggests that the temple did not remain in use for much of the 4th century. The temple was deliberately desecrated by the removal of the primary tauroctony scene, only a piece of which was found. Other than a collapsed roof, the temple was found almost exactly as the Romans had left it. The foundations of the temple are still visible, as are the wooden stakes on which the podia benches were raised. A reconstruction of the sanctuary is on display at the Great North Museum in Newcastle upon Tyne.

Directly in front of the entrance to the mithraeum the remains of an apse, well, and altar were found and named as the Shrine to the Nymphs and Genius Loci, sometimes referred to as a "nymphaeum". Found in 1957 and excavated in 1960, this was the least used temple at Carrawburgh. The Shrine may not have had a traditional building, rather it was a paved and an open air shrine. The altar, dedicated by M. Hispanius Modestinus c. AD 213, was inscribed identically on two sides, and stood on a pedestal indicating it was out in the open, and meant to be walked around. It is likely that this shrine was built during a period of disuse of the Mithraeum as it was located so close to the Mithraic Temple. The building of the second Mithraeum reused materials from the Shrine to the Nymphs and Genius Loci, but preserved the altar. The shrine has a destruction layer around AD 300, roughly the same time as a destruction layer at the Temple to Mithras.

The third site was 'Coventina's Well', a centre for worship of the Romano-British goddess Coventina. This sanctuary, discovered by Clayton in 1876, is the source of the stream. The well is known for the findings of over 13,000 coins, sculptural reliefs, and altars. It was built c.AD128-133, during the construction of the Vallum, in order to help control the water level of the area, it is likely after this it became associated with Coventina with the height of the cult being in the late 2nd to early 3rd centuries when the Batavians were stationed at the fort.

No remains of the nymphaeum or well are now visible.

Ownership
Having been in private hands for many years, the fort, which is a scheduled monument, was gifted to the nation in January 2020 by Jennifer Du Cane, whose family have owned the site since the 1950s. The fort is now in the ownership of Historic England and administered by English Heritage.

References

External links

Brocolitia at http://roman-britain.co.uk/
BROCOLITIA FORT on the line of Hadrian's Wall as it exists today

Mithraea
Roman fortifications in England
Roman sites in Northumberland
Forts of Hadrian's Wall
Villages in Northumberland
Roman religious sites in England
Archaeological sites in Northumberland
Former populated places in Northumberland